The Python for S60 also called PyS60 (Unix name), was Nokia's port of the general Python programming language to its S60 software platform, originally based on Python 2.2.2 from 2002.
The latest final version, PyS60-2.0.0, released on 11 February 2010 updated the python core to version 2.5.4.

Release history

First released in 2005, PyS60 featured a relatively small set of modules and functions. Version 1.2, the last non-opensource release and the second version of PyS60, brought many improvements and was made available on 21 October 2005 on Forum Nokia.

After becoming open source, PyS60 had the advantage of a strong and dedicated community that could actively contribute to improving it. The milestone release was Version 1.3.11.

The final version to support S60 2nd Edition platform, 1.4.5, was released on 3 December 2008.
On 24 December 2008, a developer version, 1.9.0, was released. It featured several improvements, the main of which was a new core based on Python 2.5.1.
The latest final version, 2.0.0, was released on 11 February 2010. Its core is based on Python 2.5.4.

See also 

 List of Python software
 List of integrated development environments for Python
 Open Programming Language for older Symbian devices

References

External links

 Nokia Research Center - Python for S60
 Maemo Garage - Python for S60
 SourceForge.net - Python for S60

Class-based programming languages
Dynamically typed programming languages
Mobile software programming tools
Nokia services
Object-oriented programming languages
Python (programming language)
Python (programming language) implementations
S60 (software platform)
Scripting languages
Smartphones
Symbian software